The Senate Commerce Subcommittee on Surface Transportation and Merchant Marine Infrastructure, Safety, and Security is one of the six subcommittees within the Senate Committee on Commerce, Science and Transportation.

Members, 116th Congress

External links
Committee on Commerce, Science and Transportation website, Subcommittee page

Commerce Transportation